ZMM may refer to:
ZeniMax Media, a video game holding 
Zen and the Art of Motorcycle Maintenance (more commonly abbreviated as ZAMM)
Zygomaticus minor muscle